The 1959 Southeast Asian Peninsular Games, officially known as the 1st Southeast Asian Peninsular Games, was the first and inaugural edition of the biennial multi-sport event for Southeast Asian athletes, organised by the SEAP Games Federation. It was held in Bangkok, Thailand from 12 to 17 December 1959 with 12 sports featured in the games. Cambodia, one of the six founding members of the SEAP Games Federation, did not compete at the inaugural edition. For the first time and first among all Southeast Asian nations, Thailand hosted the Southeast Asian Peninsular Games, which later known as the Southeast Asian Games. The games was opened and closed by Bhumibol Adulyadej, the King of Thailand at the Suphachalasai Stadium. The final medal tally was led by host Thailand, followed by its neighbouring countries, Burma and Malaya.

The games

Participating nations
Singapore was a self-governing British crown colony at that time.

  Burma
  Laos
 
  Singapore
  (host)

Sports

Medal summary

References

External links
 Summary 1959
 Medal Tally 1959-1995
 Medal Tally
 History of the SEA Games
 OCA SEA Games
 SEA Games previous medal table
 SEAGF Office  
 SEA Games members
   

 
Southeast Asian Peninsular Games
Southeast Asian Peninsular Games
Southeast Asian Peninsular Games
Southeast Asian Peninsular Games
Southeast Asian Games in Thailand
Southeast Asian Games by year
Southeast Asian Peninsular Games